The Quechua broad-nosed bat (Platyrrhinus masu) is a species of bat in the family Phyllostomidae. It is found in Bolivia and Peru.

References

Platyrrhinus
Mammals described in 2005
Bats of South America
Mammals of Bolivia
Mammals of Peru